Peter Samuelsson (born 20 November 1981) is a Swedish former footballer who played as a forward.

References

External links

1981 births
Living people
Association football forwards
Degerfors IF players
Nybergsund IL players
Kongsvinger IL Toppfotball players
Örebro SK players
Allsvenskan players
Superettan players
Swedish footballers
Expatriate footballers in Norway